Justo Antonio de Olaguibel was a Spanish architect born in Vitoria on 7 August 1752. He died in Vitoria on 11 February 1818. Olaguibel was one of the most important neoclassic architects in the Basque Country.

The architect studied in the Image School in Vitoria and in Royal San Fernando Academy of Madrid (in Spanish Academia Real San Fernando). He designed many landmarks of Vitoria, such as Los Arquillos or the Plaza España of Vitoria. He also designed two roads: the one which connected Vitoria with La Guardia and the road that connected Briñas and Amurrio, in 1792 and in 1793.

Biography

Early life 
The Olaguibel family was originally from Durango. However, in the XVIII the family was already located in Vitoria and it was related to the field of construction. Justo Antonio's father, who was a master builder, took a lot of care of his son's career, so he signed his son up at an early age in the Drawing School of Vitoria, which was dependent of the Real Sociedad Bascongada de Amigos del País. The father's aim was his son to be educated following the academic methods of that period. As a student, Olaguibel stood out among the other pupils, due to his fast learning. This fact encouraged Olaguibel to apply for a place in the Royal San Fernando Academy of Fine Art, in Madrid, in order to improve his studies in architecture and to achieve the qualification he needed.

Beginning as an architect 
In 1781, under mayor Ramón María de Urbina, Olaguíbel was offered to design the Plaza Nueva (currently known as Plaza de España), the first neoclassic square in Vitoria. It served as a model for the main squares in Tudela, San Sebastian and Bilbao. This square became the centre of urban activity of Vitoria. Nevertheless, the square was not yet connected to the ancient part of the city, because of the slope between them. Therefore, Olaguibel designed Los Arquillos in 1790, which was a solution to the problem, as it connected the square with the old part of Vitoria harmoniously. Between the two parts are balconies and platforms connected by stairs. The purpose of the architect was to join the old and new parts of Vitoria in a fluent way.

These two works made Olaguibel famous, not only because of adding the first neoclassic buildings to Vitoria, but also to the Basque Country.

Religious architecture 
After having creating these two works and specially after 1794, Olaguibel directed his career towards religious creations such as arcades, towers and other smaller constructions, which took part in many villages in the prairie of Alava. His career seemed to be prospering, but this change in the architect's mind made other architects from Vitoria and from other cities to take part in the construction of buildings in the city.

Justo Antonio de Olaguibel never had a government job, despite the high social class of his job. However, he was related to some personalities of the epoch, such as Samaniego.

Olaguibel spent most of his effort building the facade of the Magdalena Convent (Spanish: Convento de Magdalena) in 1783. The convent was located where the New Cathedral of Vitoria is now sited. Nevertheless, they managed not to demolish the building and the facade was transferred to Vicente Goikoetxea street. Fausto Iñiguez de Betolaza was the one in charge of the move.

Last years of life 
In 1789 the architect built the San Andrés church in Elciego, showing his perfect architecture and how expert he was in his job. In 1806, before the Peninsular War Olaguibel designed the house of the bishop Juan Joé Díaz de Espada in Armentia.

Olaguibel died on the 11th of February, 1818, in Vitoria.

Important buildings 

 Plaza España, Vitoria (1781–1791)
 Facade of the Magdalena convent, Vitoria (1783)
 Tower and arcade from Done Bikendi church in Arriaga, Vitoria (1787)
 Town Hall, Orendain (1787)
 San Andres Church, Elciego (1789)
 Town Hall, Leintz Gatzaga (1789)
 Los Arquillos, Vitoria (1790)
 Public fountain, Haro
 Arcade of the church, Aberasturi (1801)
 House of bishop José Díaz Espada, Armentia (1806)

References 

https://web.archive.org/web/20130720120509/http://ehai-cva.com/httpdocs/paginas/fondos/olaguibel.html

18th-century Spanish architects
People from Vitoria-Gasteiz
1752 births
1818 deaths
Architects from the Basque Country (autonomous community)